Labadi, also known as La, is a Peri-urban town in La Dade Kotopon Municipal District in the Greater Accra Region of Ghana.

Location 

Labadi is located along the coast of the Atlantic Ocean. Its distance by road from Kotoka International Airport is 7.11 kilometers (3.04 miles). It is bounded by Osu to the west and Teshie to the east.

Politics 
Labadi is in the Dade Kotopon constituency, led by Rita Naa Odoley Sowah of the National Democratic Congress. She succeeded Vincent Sowah Odotei, a member of the New Patriotic Party. who also succeeded Nii Amasah Namoale of the National Democratic Congress.

Notable Labadians 

 Rita Naa Odoley Sowah; Politician former MCE of  La Dade kotopon Municipal Assembly (LADMA) and member of parliament of La Dade kotopon Constituency.

References 

Populated places in the Greater Accra Region